Kamenka is a rural locality (a village) in Suksunsky District, Perm Krai, Russia. The population was 188 as of 2010. There are 5 streets.

Geography 
Kamenka is located 39 km east of Suksun (the district's administrative centre) by road. Krasny Lug is the nearest rural locality.

References 

Rural localities in Perm Krai